Maharani Bagh is a residential area in South East Delhi, comprising several blocks and multiple markets. It is one of the most posh and upscale neighbourhoods of Delhi and is home to some of the most influential families from government and business. Maharani Bagh is a sought after, gated residential area within New Friends Colony and consists of residential parks surrounded by large bungalows. Some of its notable residents include BJP leader Meneka Gandhi and, spokesperson and businessman, Suhel Seth.

Nearby
Jamia Millia Islamia
New Friends Colony
 Ashram chowk 
Jeewan Nagar
 Kilokari

References

Neighbourhoods in Delhi
South Delhi district